The 1918 municipal election was held December 9, 1918 to elect a mayor and six aldermen to sit on Edmonton City Council, three trustees to sit on the public school board, and four trustees to sit on the separate school board.

There were ten aldermen on city council, but four of the positions were already filled: Matthew Esdale, James Kinney, Warren Prevey, and Orlando Bush were all elected to two-year terms in 1917 and were still in office. Charles Wilson was also elected to a two-year term in 1917, but resigned to run for mayor; accordingly, Charles Grant was elected to a one-year term.

There were seven trustees on the public school board, but four of the positions were already filled: Henry Douglas, J A McPherson, Arthur Cushing, and E T Bishop had all been elected to two-year terms in 1917.  On the eight member separate board, four of the positions were filled: M Kelly, F A French, Joseph Henri Picard, and H J Roche had been elected to two-year terms in 1917.  To keep the terms properly staggered, one trustee - Paul Jenvrin - was elected to a one-year term.

Voter turnout

There were 9046 ballots cast out of 10825 eligible voters, for a voter turnout of 83.5%.

Results

 bold or  indicates elected
 italics indicate incumbent
 "SS", where data is available, indicates representative for Edmonton's South Side, with a minimum South Side representation instituted after the city of Strathcona, south of the North Saskatchewan River, amalgamated into Edmonton on February 1, 1912.

Mayor

Aldermen

Public school trustees

Separate (Catholic) school trustees

Under the minimum South Side representation rule, Murray was elected over Curtis.

References

City of Edmonton: Edmonton Elections

1918
1918 elections in Canada
1918 in Alberta